Sarijalu or Sari Jaloo or Sari Jallu may refer to:
 Sarijalu, East Azerbaijan
 Sarijalu, Takab, West Azerbaijan Province
 Sarijalu, Urmia, West Azerbaijan Province
 Sarijalu, Zanjan